Eti Haungatau (born 25 September 2000) is an American rugby union player.

Rugby career
Haungatau has been playing rugby since she was nine years old. She is the niece of 2016 Olympian, Joanne Fa'avesi, and is a cousin of another 2016 Olympian, Folau Niua.

In 2019, Haungatau scored two tries for the Eagles against a Barbarians side in April. She made her international debut for the Eagles fifteens against England at the Super Series in June. She later debuted for the Eagles sevens at the USA Women's Sevens in October.

Haungatau was selected in the United States squad for the 2021 Rugby World Cup in New Zealand.

References

External links 
 Eagles Profile

Living people
2000 births
Female rugby sevens players
Female rugby union players
American female rugby sevens players
American female rugby union players
United States international rugby sevens players
United States women's international rugby union players